This is a list of lighthouses in Ceuta.

Lighthouses

See also
 List of lighthouses in Spain
 Lists of lighthouses and lightvessels

References

External links

 

Ceuta
Lighthouses